Howard Robard Hughes Sr. (September 9, 1869 – January 14, 1924) was an American businessman and inventor. He was the founder of Hughes Tool Company. He invented the "Sharp–Hughes" rotary tri-cone rock drill bit during the Texas Oil Boom. He is best known as the father and namesake of Howard Hughes, the famous American business tycoon.

Early life
Howard Robard Hughes Sr. was born on September 9, 1869, in Lancaster, Missouri, the son of Jean Amelia (née Summerlin; 1842–1928) and Judge Felix Turner Hughes (1837-1926). Hughes's older sister Greta, better known by her stage name Jeanne Greta, was a grand opera and concert singer. His younger brother, Rupert Hughes, was a famed novelist and screenwriter. Another brother, Felix Jr., was a baritone opera singer. Hughes was a classic entrepreneur, trying and failing at many things before eventually finding success. After spending his childhood and early adulthood in Keokuk, Iowa, he lived in various places such as New York City (where he was a member of the Harvard Club); Denver, Colorado; Joplin, Missouri; and Beaumont, Texas; before finally settling in Houston (where Howard Jr. was born).

Education
Hughes Sr. was educated at Missouri Military Academy, in Mexico, Missouri. He then entered Harvard University in 1893, dropping out the next year.

Career

Hughes Sr. married Allene Stone Gano, on June 24, 1904, in Dallas County, Texas and engaged in various mining business endeavors before capitalizing on the Spindletop oil discovery in Texas, as a result of which he began devoting his full-time to the oil business. Hughes's two-cone rotary drill bit, nicknamed "rock eater", penetrated medium and hard rock with ten times the speed of any former bit, and its development revolutionized oil well drilling.

It is unlikely that he actually invented the two-cone roller bit, but his legal experience helped him in understanding that its patents were important for capitalizing on the invention. According to the PBS show History Detectives, several other people and companies had produced similar drill bits years earlier.

He co-founded the Sharp-Hughes Tool Company with Walter Benona Sharp in 1909, and after Sharp's death in 1912, took over management. Hughes began purchasing the Sharp stock immediately and by 1918 had acquired full ownership of the company. The essential assets of Hughes Tool Company (as it was renamed) were August 10, 1909 patents for his dual-cone rotary drill bit. The fees for licensing this technology were the basis of Hughes Tool's revenues, and by 1914 the dual-cone roller bit was used in eleven U.S. states and in thirteen foreign countries. Hughes himself whimsically remarked that one of his "fond plans" was to "drill the deepest well in the world", comparing his quest to the Earth's center to Amundsen's South Pole expedition and Robert Peary's North Pole expeditions.

Death and legacy

On January 14, 1924, Hughes Sr. died of a heart attack caused by an embolism at his company's offices on the fifth floor of the Humble Oil Building in Houston at the age of 54. After his death, his only child, Howard Jr., assumed control of the company as its 75% owner at the age of 19. In his will, Hughes Sr. had left the remaining 25% to his parents, Felix Sr. and Mimi, and his brother Felix Jr. A little more than a year after his father's death, Hughes Jr. had himself declared an adult (the age of majority at the time being 21) and bought out his grandparents and uncle, now controlling the entirety of Hughes Tool Company. The next year in 1925, Hughes Jr. appointed Noah Dietrich as CEO of Hughes Tool while he himself left for California to pursue filmmaking and aviation.

In 1933, Hughes Tool engineers created a tri-cone rotary drill bit, and from 1934 to 1951 Hughes's market share approached 100%. The Sharp-Hughes Rock Bit found virtually all the oil discovered during the initial years of rotary drilling, and Hughes Jr. became one of the wealthiest people in the world from its revenues. Returning to play a more central role in Hughes Tool in the 1940s, Hughes Jr. diversified the company's holdings by expanding into filmmaking, aviation, and the casino industry in Las Vegas, although his father's core tool manufacturing business remained by far the company's chief source of revenue. In 1972, by which time Hughes Tool had become widely diversified, Hughes Jr. sold the nucleus tool division and realized $150 million from the sale. In 1987, Hughes Tool merged with Baker International to form Baker Hughes, a large oilfield services company still based in Houston.

Awards and achievements
The "Sharp–Hughes" patent rotary rock drill bit was designated a Historic Mechanical Engineering Landmark by the American Society of Mechanical Engineers on August 10, 2009, at The Woodlands, Texas.

See also

 List of people from Missouri

References

External links
 Howard R. Hughes Sr. at the Handbook of Texas

1869 births
1924 deaths
American businesspeople in the oil industry
American chief executives of manufacturing companies
American investors
American inventors
American manufacturing businesspeople
Burials at Glenwood Cemetery (Houston, Texas)
Businesspeople from Missouri
Harvard University alumni
Iowa State University alumni
People educated at Missouri Military Academy
People from Lancaster, Missouri